The 2002 WNBA season was the 6th season for the Sacramento Monarchs. The team missed the playoffs for the first time in four years.

Offseason

WNBA Draft

Regular season

Season standings

Season schedule

Player stats

References

Sacramento Monarchs seasons
Sacramento
2002 in sports in California
Sacramento Monarchs